Paul Martin (June 6, 1883 – March 19, 1932) was an American commercial artist and illustrator. His artwork appeared on over two dozen covers of Collier's and Parents during the 1920s. Martin designed the then-largest-ever electrical display in 1917. It towered above Times Square until 1924. He reshaped the then-famous mascot of Fisk Tires in 1930. Martin designed the official poster for the Girl Scouts in 1931. It was displayed at their troop meetings from 1931 to 37. He played in sanctioned tennis tournaments around the New York metropolitan area from 1909 to 31. This included the U.S. National Championships (now US Open) of 1920–21, 24 (all after age 35). The Paul Martin Singles Tournament was held for eighty-four years, between 1932 and 2019. He played doubles with Franklin P. Adams, teamed with Vincent Richards, and collaborated on a book with Howard R. Garis. His wartime painting (pictured below right) has been periodically exhibited at the International Tennis Hall of Fame since 1965.

Background
The golden age of illustration began in the 1880s. Major advancements in printing techniques were then taking place. This included breakthroughs in the halftone process. It made the printing of images for commercial use more economical, feasible, and realistic. The singular process of wood engraving (strenuous, time consuming) was replaced with photo engraving (higher accuracy level). Artist, writer, teacher, innovator Howard Pyle, worked with multiple mediums and is generally considered to be "The Father of American Illustration." Others who gained fame in this field included Howard Chandler Christy, Harrison Fisher, James Montgomery Flagg, Charles Dana Gibson, John Held Jr., J. C. Leyendecker, Maxfield Parrish, Coles Phillips, Frederic Remington, Norman Rockwell, Jessie Willcox Smith and N. C. Wyeth.

However, the vast majority of magazine illustrators received little recognition, compared to fine artists. This was due to their artwork being viewed as commercially (not creatively) inspired. Nonetheless, these then-obscure illustrators played an important role, in communicating (and documenting) the people's aspirations, concerns, customs, humor, ideals, labor, morals and social interests. One of them was Paul Martin, whose work appeared on the covers of Collier's, Everybody's, Farm & Fireside, The Farmer's Wife, Liberty, Parents and People's Home Journal from 1923 to 31. These seven were once among the most widely circulated publications.

The magazine industry relied heavily on advertising revenue. It was adversely affected by the popularity of radio and especially television. These far-reaching mediums were much more appealing to advertisers. The specialized magazines fared better (for example, Parents). They targeted specific (not diverse) audiences, and suffered fewer losses in readership and revenue. Later came the Internet, which forced them out of business or to go digital for survival. Another point is that major advancements in photographic equipment and technology took place during the 1930s. This brought about the gradual changeover (25-plus years) from illustrated to photographic covers. The artistic version still lingered on, because of its innovative and enchanting qualities, until succumbing to Photoshop and other graphic design software.

Collier's
General-interest magazines were once very popular with mainstream audiences. One of them was the historically significant Collier's, which had a revival under editor William L. Chenery in 1925. Martin drew many of its covers during the mid-Roaring Twenties, including seven in 1925 (twenty 1923–27). Two of them were for Christmas issues (1924, 26). Some artists created a niche and stuck with it, such as in drawing comical situations, domestic follies, political satire, pretty women, or simple pleasures. His recurring theme was of a youthful boy engaged in various lighthearted activities or situations. This included the following: catching a baseball, loading up on desserts (pictured below), playing the flute, decked out in a straw hat, shooting marbles, shoveling snow, carrying books on head, winding up a spinning top, eating turkey, bobbing for apples, playing football (pictured), sleigh riding, happily swimming, getting hair shaved, saying grace, working as a messenger, daydreaming about fishing and going down a water slide. He seldom veered from that subject matter. The most striking departure was for a self-portrait cover. He portrayed himself as a well-dressed, vocal spectator at the horse races.

His drawing style was simple yet bold. It captured the brightness, carefreeness, and innocence of youth. There was a nostalgic element to them. They resonated with the populace, who had just lived through a catastrophic world war and influenza pandemic. Martin excluded the non-essential details (extra people, scenery, structures, trees, etc.), which allowed viewers to make an instant connection. His paintings were often easy to recognize, since their theme and style remained fairly consistent. They sometimes gave the illusion of three-dimensional depth. This was done through the use of various techniques, such as color intensity variation, linear perspective and overlapping. His cover art practically always had a holiday/seasonal theme or portrayed the magazine's overall image. This was common practice back then. It only once corresponded to an inside article.

Creative Process. Martin started by coming up with ideas and turning them into conceptual sketches. These rough drafts were submitted to art editors, for their review and consideration for publication. He continued working on the ones approved, which came back with or without a modification request. (The rejects were sometimes submitted elsewhere.) He then hired boys for photo sessions, most of whom lived locally. His drawings were made from processed photos rather than from long, real-life sittings. This gave him more options and flexibility. The preliminary and final versions were based on multiple images captured during the shoot (along with some improvising). This was also a more practical process, due to children's natural tendency to be active and impatient. He would interact with them from behind the camera, in order to get the desired facial expression. His wife assisted by preparing the models for their scene. Collier's couldn't keep up with the rapidly changing times following World War II, and ceased publication in December 1956. The main culprit was television, which dramatically affected its advertising and circulation revenue. Collier's top competitors (Life, Look and Post) were able to hold out longer.

Commercial artist

Martin designed "Wrigley Gum's" light bulb spectacular, which showcased six acrobatic "spearmen" on a Broadway billboard in 1917. It was the world's largest-ever electrical display at 200 feet by 50 feet. It covered an entire city block in Times Square, between 43rd and 44th Sts. This panoramic light show was a major tourist attraction for seven years. The Wrigley name was synonymous with big-time advertising. He designed a poster titled "Serve Your Country," for the War Camp Community Service in 1918. It depicted a fashionable young woman serving in tennis (play on words). Women were encouraged to entertain off-duty soldiers, by participating with them in various social activities (dancing, dining, sightseeing, etc.). A silkscreened version of this poster (pictured below), has been periodically displayed at the International Tennis Hall of Fame in Newport, Rhode Island.

He sketched five different scenes of snow activities for the New York, Ontario and Western Railway (a passenger/freight carrier) in 1921–22. They described Sullivan County's Catskill Mountains, as a lively and refreshing vacation spot. He designed greeting cards for the printing house William Edwin Rudge, Inc. in 1921. Martin drew a cheerful boy eating baked beans for Heinz 57 in 1927. Also, two posters for the American Junior Red Cross, 1929–30. The first was titled "The Flag of Service the World Around." It featured children in festive costumes behind a globe, with one holding up a large Red Cross flag. The second was titled "Juniors Helping Everywhere." It showed twenty miniature scenes of children worldwide, in their various supportive roles. Martin designed three billboards for the Hecker H-O (Hornby's Oatmeal) Company of Buffalo, New York, in 1931. One showed a confident young football player being patched up, who had oats for breakfast (pictured). The other two emphasized its healthiness and goodness. These large advertisements (25 feet by 12 feet) appeared on poster panels, to attract passing motorists and pedestrians. They also had short runs in food markets—on their walls, windows, or hanging from overhead wires.

Martin painted three advertisements for General Electric's all-steel "Monitor Top" refrigerator in 1930. The first and most elaborate featured two boys running a lemonade stand. Their mother looks on with approval, through the open kitchen window. It appeared as a full-page ad in many different magazines at the same time. A review from Printers' Ink in 1930: " 'Electric Lemonaide, 5 cents per glass,' reads the sign of the youthful shopkeepers. ... [They] are soliciting trade in a strenuous manner, as a friendly dog enters into the spirit of the event with challenging barks. ... [I]t is a picture filled with action and story-telling strength. But because the advertised product has been worked in so adroitly, the illustration seems doubly effective and relevant." His other "Monitor Top" credits were of a girl (with doll) playing with building blocks, and two dressed-up girls listening to an enthusiastic sales boy. It was proclaimed as the first reliable and affordable model for residential use (though at a hefty price).

He painted a contest-winning poster for the Girl Scouts in 1931. It was titled "Usefulness Beauty Health Truth Knowledge." This contest was conducted by the Art Alliance of America, an organization that brought together craftworkers and the advertising industry. There were two-hundred-plus submissions. The judging panel consisted of W. T. Benda (who replaced Charles Dana Gibson), Ray Greenleaf, Rockwell Kent, John La Gatta, Neysa McMein and Edward A. Wilson. Martin's model for the poster was Barbara Smith, a 14-year-old from Darien, Connecticut (previously, Yonkers, N.Y.). Her parents and Martin were lifelong friends. He even served as best man at their wedding, back in 1904. His winning entry earned him a $300 first-place check, from the Girl Scouts' National Director Josephine Schain (pictured far below). This ceremonial exchange took place at their national headquarters, on Lexington Avenue in Manhattan. It also occurred right after Schain presented awards of $200 and $100, to the second- and third-place winners. The top three finishers then posed together next to their entries (pictured far below). National President Birdsall Otis Edey was one of three consultants, along with executives Anne Hyde Choate and Genevieve Garvan Brady. His poster faithfully and strikingly captured the spirit of their character-building movement. It was displayed at the troop meeting places (on bulletin boards, stands or windows), and on the bedroom walls of its members from 1931 to 37. It also appeared on the catalog cover of Girl Scout Equipment for Fall 1932 and Spring 1933. They were all modified to show three raised fingers instead of a salute. Martin said at the award ceremony: "Barbara seems [to be] the personification of all that Girl Scouting means. She is the very spirit of radiant, happy and wholesome young girlhood, and my mind naturally turned to her immediately when I learned of the competition."

His drawings also ended up on Gerlach Barklow calendars, ink blotter cards and prints for business advertising, such as one titled "Singin' in the Rain" from 1931. It depicted a seated boy sheltering several pups from the rain with an umbrella (pictured). Another showed a boy reading about scientific theories with some difficulty. His work appeared in many different types of print media. Martin's paintings often included a cute and friendly pup. He drew covers for four different trade publications between 1920 & 1931. They were as follows: Advertising & Selling, Good Hardware, Progressive Grocer (voice of the food retail industry) and Silent Hostess (recipes and tips for homemakers). Martin's third and fourth covers were for the then-newly established Progressive Grocer. Coincidentally, the helmet-wearing kid for H-O Oats (pictured), later served as its associate editor from 1956 to 62.

Another credit was mentioned in a magazine for war veterans. As follows: "The cover design on this issue of Foreign Service (pictured) is a two-color reproduction of the official 1932 Buddy Poppy poster. [It was so named because former soldiers used that word, when describing a squadmate who perished in WWI.] The original was painted in oil by the late Paul Martin, noted New York poster artist, who died suddenly on March 19th following a serious operation. The poster has been pronounced as one of the most striking and appropriate designs ever used, to depict the symbolism of the Buddy Poppy. [A vivid red artificial flower, worn in honor of the fallen Allied soldiers.] It was completed shortly before the artist's death and is believed to have been his last important assignment [vague]. Those familiar with Paul Martin's career as an artist, declare the 1932 Buddy Poppy poster to be one of his best creations." It was pictured in a variety of newspapers, 1932–33.

Fisk tire boy

The Fisk Rubber Company was producing automobile, bicycle and carriage tires by 1901. Its factory was located along the riverfront in Chicopee Falls, Mass. The plant pumped out some 230,000 tires in August 1921. Fisk struggled financially before and during the Great Depression. It was bought out by U.S. Rubber, manufacturer of the U.S. Royal brand (1940). Its worldwide subsidiaries (under various names) received the unifying name of Uniroyal (1966). This company merged with another giant and became Uniroyal Goodrich (1986). Its tire division was sold to Michelin (1990). Fisk tires were sold primarily by Kmart (1965–78) and Discount Tire (1996–2014).

Martin completely reshaped a once-famous and whimsical character in American advertising. It was the Fisk Rubber Company's "bedtime boy," who shouldered an oversized tire while dangling a lighted candle. It came with the motoring message, "Time to Re-tire" (debut 1910). This catchphrase had a simple double meaning. The lad's prodigious yawn became a smile in early 1929 (initial change). Martin was then commissioned to come up with a slightly more aged, modern-day figure in late 1929. The objective was to update the heavily publicized trademark, while still maintaining its charm and familiarity. Transition Process: The boy's one-piece sleeper became a two-piece pajama set. Added for more style were the zip-up slippers. His four-year-old nephew served as the model (neck down only). The pose and all-important props remained basically intact. However, with the latest tire design and a more fashionable, less tilted candle holder. Many newspapers ran a story that complimented the new look, May–June 1930. The youngster was described as more boyish, energetic, fit, and modern ("in keeping with the times"). The initial review was made by the publicity manager at Fisk in March 1930. As follows:

      "a happy, smiling, 100-percent American boy in his little two-piece pajama[s], radiating good cheer, ruddy-cheeked and tousle-headed, snappy and wide awake, standing in the old-time pose."

The now-updated version was used by Fisk Tires in advertisements, to showcase its newly introduced "Air-Flights." This included thirteen times in The Saturday Evening Post, between Feb 8 and Aug 23, 1930 (latter pictured). It was offered to the public as a "suitable for framing" 11-by-14-inch, colorful art print. The cheerful mascot then appeared on various items. These were either with or without a facial touch-up (three variants pictured). For instance, on the front cover and endpapers of fairy- or folktale books for children in 1931. Titled (8): Candy Land, Jack and the Bean Stalk, Little Black Sambo, Peter Rabbit, Pied Piper, Three Bears, Three Little Kittens and Three Little Pigs. They were generically subtitled Time to Re-tire / A Bedtime Story. It also appeared on ashtrays, bridge score pads, cigarette cases, electrical clocks, jigsaw puzzles (pictured), matchbooks, posters and rubber heel replacements for shoes. These were complimentary items for actual or potential customers (excluding the clocks).

Martin's grinning figure was used by Fisk retailers on their data books, display windows, letterheads, and mailing envelopes (pictured). It showed up in miniature form in The American Boy and Boys' Life magazines (along with hundreds of newspapers) from 1930 to 34. However, advertisements by Fisk and its dealers were fairly rare from 1931 to 36. Two-thirds of its dealers did not meet new financial requirements, and thereby lost their franchise in November 1930. This drastic corporate downsizing was done to cut operating costs. It followed three consecutive years of declining sales and mounting debts. The Great Depression had devastated the entire rubber industry through fierce price wars. They were already taking place due to competition from mail-order houses. Martin's figure was never firmly established with a strong promotion campaign, involving significant (yet necessary) expenditures. Fisk defaulted on interest payments to bondholders and entered receivership in January 1931. The restructuring process ended with the naming of a new management team, May 1933. They decided to go back to the original character based on public sentiment in late 1934. This was an unusual regression, as other companies had successfully modernized their own mascots (some multiple times).

Timetable. Three stages of the pajama-clad boy, as seen in print or on advertising material. a. 1910–28, 35–onward (created by Burr Giffen, an agency art director). It still showed up in newspaper ads during the transition year of 1929. b. 1929–30 (yawn changed into a smile—anonymous). c. 1930–34 (modern makeover by Paul Martin). It still showed up in newspaper ads during the transition year of 1935. His credits include all of, and only, the version with the two-piece pajamas. Its public debut was in the Saturday Evening Post issue of February 8, 1930. Overall note: There were also minor touch-ups made in various years. Incidental note: Norman Rockwell drew paintings featuring the trade character, which were published in 1917–20, 23–25.

He received the coveted commission (paragraph 2, line 6) by developing a reputation for drawing boys. It was then common practice among artists to create their own niche. The subjects of boys, dogs and pretty women were popular themes in that era.

Life and tennis
He was born to Hannah A. (née Morrow) and Robert C. Martin (a brick merchant) in New York City on June 6, 1883. He was the second youngest of nine children. Three of them did not reach adulthood. The family home was located between 8th and 9th Aves., on 31st St. in Manhattan throughout the 1880s. The Martin clan moved way up to Central Harlem on Edgecombe Ave. in 1890. Young Paul lost two sisters between 1891 & 1893. The family relocated within Central Harlem, to 129th and 5th in 1898. They belonged to the Twenty-fourth Street M. E. Church (till 1890) and Calvary  Church (till 1908). His father was the superintendent of their Sunday schools. Martin immensely enjoyed drawing as a boy (future vocation). His first regular job was as a brokerage clerk at age 16. He studied commercial art at the National Academy of Design from 1902 to 06. His first career job was with the New-York Tribune as its art manager from 1905 to 12. He succeeded the innovative Stephen H. Horgan. Martin continued to live at home during those years. The family moved from Upper Manhattan to Maplewood, New Jersey, 1908. Their new church was located just two blocks away. They lived near a train station, which allowed them to commute into Manhattan. He joined the local tennis club and started competing in sanctioned tournaments, 1909. His first two tourneys were on the courts of Nyack and Morristown, Aug–Sep 1909. He broke in with Ralph, an older brother by 12 years, who was related by marriage to Charles Yardley Turner.

Martin married Lauretta Willey (pronounced "will-ee") at the First M. E. Church on Washington St. in Hoboken, New Jersey, 1912. It was officiated by Rector Rev. Henry J. Johnston. The couple first met many years earlier at Calvary Methodist. Lauretta's siblings were schoolteacher Emma and accountant Walter (who later owned the Willey Book ). Their first home together was in the University Heights section of the Bronx, 1912. They relocated one block east to another rental, 1915. He worked for the O. J. Gude Company from 1912 to 19. It was the innovative industry leader in outdoor advertising. His Gude office was first located at 935 Broadway, 1912–13 ... and then at 220 West 42nd (Candler Bldg. in Times Square), 1913–19. He worked for the advertising firm Gotham Studios from 1919 to 20. Its headquarters moved from 1133 Broadway (St. James Bldg.) to East 24th St., near 4th (now Park) Ave. on January 1, 1920. Martin went freelance and rented a small studio, Aug–Sep 1920. It was located on East 27th St., between Lexington and 3rd Aves. He could now work independently, with flexible hours, creative control, and (adversely) income uncertainty. He joined the Artists' Guild in December 1920.

Paul and Lauretta moved from the Bronx to a rural, forested area of Millwood, New York, August 1925. Their first owned home doubled as a working studio (upper floor) from 1925 to 1932. Its centerpiece was a long, flat table that held the canvases, drawing pads, paint brushes and tubes. Also nearby were art books, easels, photo shoot props, and an adjacent darkroom. Natural northern light came in through the large side window. He was artistically inspired by the secluded and wooded surroundings. He occasionally used family members as models. Uncle Paul's niece Edna is shown writing down the license plate number of a boy's wagon (for knocking over her doll carriage), on the Liberty cover of September 12, 1925. She's also highlighted on an American Junior Red Cross poster. His mother-in-law is shown basting a turkey for Thanksgiving, on the People's Home Journal cover of November 1928.

He was ranked among the top thirty tennis players in the New York metropolitan area from 1920 to 1925 (top twenty, 1923–24). His strength was in making accurate shots. Martin won numerous trophies (or awards) in singles, doubles, and mixed doubles (with Lauretta) between 1919 & 1931. This included one for capturing the inaugural singles championship, at the Sunningdale Country Club in 1920. Others were for the Lake George and Lake Mohonk championships of 1924. Martin's opponents included future Hall of Famers Fred Alexander, Jean Borotra, Francis Hunter, Gerald Patterson, Vincent Richards, Bill Tilden, John Van Ryn, Marie Wagner & Watson Washburn. Other standouts were Craig Biddle, Herbert Bowman, Wylie Grant, Walter Merrill Hall, Robert Kinsey, Percy Kynaston, Nathaniel Niles, Dr. William Rosenbaum, Howard Voshell & Charles Wood. A doubles partner and longtime clubmate was newspaper columnist Franklin P. Adams, who wrote "Baseball's Sad Lexicon." A teammate was the reigning national boy champion, 14-year-old Vincent Richards.

Martin and Bill Tilden competed in over fifteen tournaments together, including the U.S. National Championships of 1920, 21 & 24. The latter was played at Forest Hills Stadium (built in 1923) and on its outlying courts, Aug 25–Sep 2, 1924. His opening round opponent was two-time Wimbledon titlist, Gerald Patterson of Australia. 41-year-old Martin won a set, but lost the match 4-6, 4-6, 9-7, 0-6. (There was a two-day rain delay after the third set.) He competed in four consecutive National Veterans' Championships (for ages 45+), at Forest Hills from 1928 to 31. Martin was a standout singles and doubles player, for both the University Heights (Bronx, N.Y.) and County (Scarsdale, N.Y.) Tennis Clubs. He was caught up in the fallout of a  ruling, 1924. It prohibited players from writing for profit after a given date. The distinction between amateurism and professionalism was hotly contested/debated from Feb–Dec 1924. Martin came out "in favor of a reconsideration of the matter." He often acted as the women's referee. He organized tournaments for youngsters, as a committee member of the Briarcliff Lodge Sports Club. The Westchester County Tennis League opened for competition in 1926. They held the annual Paul Martin Singles Tournament for over eighty years. It was initiated by player and executive Fenimore Cady, of Mount Pleasant, N.Y., 1932. The winners' names were engraved along the base, of one of Martin's prized cups (pictured). His memory was also honored by a short-lived club tourney.

He died of ulcers at age 48. This was one week after an abdominal operation at Ossining Hospital in March 1932. The service was held at Highland (now Ossining United) Methodist Church. Survivors included three brothers and one sister. His wife Lauretta "Lolly" (1880–1972), outlived him by forty years. She donated the tournament trophy named after him. His wartime painting ("Serve Your Country") was once prominently displayed, in the main room of the International Tennis Hall of Fame and Museum. Its gift shop periodically offered a coffee mug and postcard version (pictured). He was known for his athletic ability, active participation, friendliness and sportsmanship. A retrospect from the Bronxville Press in August 1932: "His presence was always felt by topnotchers, as well as by those who could play only an average game. Paul Martin was a synonym for all that was clean and wholesome in the game."

Total finals and more

This list only includes open or invitational tournaments, that were sanctioned by the United States Lawn Tennis Association. Their results largely determined the player rankings, and who qualified for the Nationals. These semi-majors are categorized by the event's host. Total finals (30). Documented breakdown follows. Wins (11). SINGLES: 1920–Sunningdale  (Scarsdale). 1924–Lake George & Lake Mohonk Tennis Clubs (Warren & Ulster Counties). CONSOLATION SINGLES: 1915–Merriewold TC (Sullivan Cty.). DOUBLES: 1922–New York Athletic Club. 1924–Lake George & Lake Mohonk. 1925–Lake George TC & West Side  (for veterans). 1931–Lake George. MIXED DOUBLES: 1920–New York TC (for married couples). Runners-up (19). SINGLES: 1919–Woodmere Club. 1922–Essex County (N.J.) CC & Powelton Club (Newburgh, N.Y.). 1923–Amackassin Club (Yonkers) & Harlem (Manhattan) TC. 1924–Oritani Field Club (Hackensack, N.J.) & Stamford (Conn.) Yacht Club. 1925–Lake George & Lake Mohonk. 1930–Lake George. DOUBLES: 1921–Greenwich (Conn.)  & Milford (Pa.) Field Club. 1925–Lake Mohonk. 1926–South Yonkers  (finalists pictured below). 1930–Lake George. 1931–Lake Mohonk. MIXED DOUBLES: 1921–Milford (Pa.). 1925–Lake George (with Lauretta). 1930–Lake George (with Lauretta). Notes. These are the ones known. For instance, results in mixed doubles were not always recorded. Hence, the one stated at Milford could easily have been lost to history. He also won many tournaments, which were open only to members of the County Tennis Club in Hartsdale. The Martins sometimes played on the circuit while vacationing.

Grand Slams (majors). This list is based solely on appearances. He lasted until the stated number of rounds. National singles (3): 1920-. 1921-2R. 1924-2R. [Lauretta: 1921-1R]. National Veterans' singles—for ages 45+ (4): 1928-4R. 1929-4R. 1930-3R. 1931-3R. It was renamed the US Open in 1968.

University Heights . A longtime committee and playing member who lived in the immediate area. He competed in their annual North Side tournaments from 1913 to 1929 (except for 1914, 26). These open events attracted a large number of entries. Martin reached the semifinals (SF) in 1913, 24 & 28. Singles (13): 1915-5R. 1916-3R. 1917-2R. 1918-4R. 1919-5R. 1920-3R. 1922-3R. 1923-4R. 1924-SF. 1925-3R. 1927-3R. 1928-SF. 1929-2R. Doubles (6): 1913-SF. 1915-3R. 1916-3R. 1919-1R. 1920-3R. 1921-1R. 1922-discontinued. Mixed Doubles: 1923-1R.

Memberships. These spans were compiled from periodical and newspaper accounts. Maplewood (N.J.)  1909–12. University Heights (Bronx) TC 1913–26. County (Hartsdale)  1926–32. He played on the circuit for 23 consecutive years, 1909–31. His twelve-year-older brother, Ralph of Mid-Lower Manhattan & then East Orange (N.J.), joined him in 1909, 11, 21–22.

Featured Match. Eastern New York State championship of 1925. A firsthand account by New York Times sportswriter, Allison Danzig. Excerpts:

Magazine cover illustrator
Most of them are artist-signed. The remainder are imprinted with the words "Cover by Paul Martin." His signature remained fairly consistent—with a curved P & M, upward slanted t-bar, and underline mark. Also, with the given name placed above the surname.

His artwork featured on Foreign Service was initially sold to (but not used by) Parents in 1930. Therefore, it was sold sequentially by Parents to American Lithographic and then to Foreign Service. Martin's artwork shown on Die Hausfrau (boy with five pups) was initially used by the Gerlach Barklow Company. Farm & Fireside became Country Home with the issue of Feb 1930.

Parents 25th anniversary issue came out in October 1951. The unique cover featured twenty-five of its previous covers, reproduced in miniature form (one for each year from 1926 to 1950). Three of Martin's made it onto this silver jubilee edition. Their dates of issue were Oct 1928, Aug 1929 and Oct 1930. He therefore, in a way, won Parents prestigious "Cover of the Year" award for 1928, 29 & 30.

The following list contains thirty-seven known credits, including three from September 1925. They are all from consumer (not trade) magazines. The latter are recorded under "Commercial artist" (paragraph 5).

 The American Girl (1917–1979): Oct 1931.
 Collier's (1888–Jan 1957): 1923-05-26, 1924-02-02 (pictured right), 1924-06-28, 1924-10-25 (pictured above), 1924-11-22, 1924-12-27, 1925-05-02, 1925-05-30, 1925-06-27, 1925-07-04, 1925-07-25, 1925-09-19, 1925-10-31, 1926-01-16, 1926-02-13, 1926-05-22, 1926-12-25, 1927-02-26, 1927-08-13, 1927-08-27.
 Everybody's (1899–1929): Sep 1925.
 Farm & Fireside / Country Home (1877–1939): Nov 1923, Aug 1930.
 The Farmer's Wife (1897–1939): Jan 1931.
 Foreign Service (1914–): May 1932.
 Die Hausfrau (1904–): Apr 1936.
 Liberty (1924–1950): Sep 12, 1925.
 Parents (Oct 1926–2022): Oct 1928, Feb 1929, May 1929, Aug 1929, Oct 1929, Feb 1930, Oct 1930.
 People's Home Journal (1885–1929): May 1928 (pictured), Nov 1928.

Book illustrator

The artistic aim here was to clarify, complement, and accurately interpret the written text. His contributions to short stories include the following: Saturday Evening Post. "Short Turns and Encores" by Dorothy Parker and others, July 29, 1922, p. 16. Collier's. "The Blanket" by Floyd Dell, October 16, 1926, p. 18. Collier's. "The Unfairway" by Burford Lorimer (son of George Horace Lorimer), December 25, 1926, pp. 22–23. Scribner's Magazine. "Tragedy" by Eve Bernstein, April 1928 p. 479. Scribner's Magazine. "On the Dark Trail" by Franklin Holt (real name Russell M. Coryell), July 1928 p. 71.

The first six listed below are fictional or semi-fictional books for children. It includes a collaboration with Howard R. Garis. This genre often required a more animated, imaginative and whimsical drawing style (yet still in sync with the story).

 Philus, the Stable Boy of Bethlehem; and Other Children's Story-Sermons for Christmas .... Edmund J. Cleveland, with a foreword by the Rt. Rev. Charles L. Slattery, Sep 1927. (Credits: dust jacket, frontispiece and facing pp. 52, 66, 124.) It contains eleven short stories covering the church year. The opener is about a stable boy who was present at the Nativity. These are pseudo-narratives with a moral message.
 Puck Chasers, Incorporated. Charles G. Muller, Sep 1927. (Credits: dust jacket, frontispiece and inside pages.) Students popularize a sport by overcoming obstacles. Setting: Fisk School for Boys, East Grand Rapids, Michigan. This is one of the earliest books with an ice hockey theme. Its predecessors tended to be on a combination of winter sports, instead of solely on ice hockey.
 Araminta. Helen Cady Forbes, Nov 1927. (Credits: dust jacket, frontispiece and facing pp. 134, 212.) Araminta turns eleven years old and finds a baby, who turns out to have been kidnapped.
 The Prince and the Pig's Gate, and Other Sermons in Story. Robert Hugh Morris, May 1928. (Credits: , frontispiece and facing pp. 48, 134, 166.) Intro: "Unsophisticated tales for children of all ages–up to 99."
 The Baseball Detective. Charles G. Muller, Aug 1928. (Credits: dust jacket, frontispiece and facing pp. 22, 132, 250-pictured.) A story of baseball, competition, friendship and mystery at Fisk School for Boys.
 Chad of Knob Hill: The Tale of a Lone Scout. Howard R. Garis, Sep 1929. Republished in 2013. (Credits: dust jacket, frontispiece and pp. 14, 60, 85, 97, 163, 187, 213, 281.) This book has a Boy Scouting theme. A marching troop crosses the path of an overworked farmhand, who promptly decides to take their oath. Garis created stories about Uncle Wiggily, a gentlemanly rabbit afflicted with rheumatism.
 Stories of To-day and Yesterday .... Frederick Houk Law, editor, Feb 1930. (Frontispiece only.) An instructional guide for older students—on how to read, write, and appreciate short stories. It includes questions and topics for classroom discussion.
 The Bookshelf for Boys and Girls. Clara Whitehill Hunt, lead editor, 1930-31 and 1931-32 editions. (Dust jackets only.) The best books for children are carefully selected. An authoritative guide for parents, in catalog format with descriptive notes.

Photos of Paul

References and notes
Continuity Guidelines: Notes follow the sources. They are directly related or give additional details. This pattern can be somewhat confusing when the same source is cited more than once. Keywords are sometimes placed in parentheses, right after the corresponding

External links

1883 births
1932 deaths
American illustrators
American male tennis players
Artists from New York City
National Academy of Design alumni
New-York Tribune personnel
Tennis people from New York (state)